Richard Joseph (23 April 1953 – 4 March 2007) was an English computer game composer, musician and sound specialist. He had a career spanning 20 years starting in the early days of gaming on the C64 and the Amiga and onto succeeding formats.

Biography
Prior to working in games Richard had a fleeting career in the music industry working with artists such as Trevor Horn and Hugh Padgham. Richard released one solo single on EMI and was part of the group CMU which released two albums (although Richard was only involved with the second, Space Cabaret) on Transatlantic before evolving into jazz funk band Shakatak.

Richard was noted in game audio for bringing "real" voice actors into a game for the first time (Mega Lo Mania), the earliest use of interactive music (Chaos Engine), working with established recording artists (Betty Boo on Magic Pockets, Captain Sensible on Sensible Soccer, Brian May on Rise of the Robots and John Foxx on Gods and Speedball 2), and featuring vocals in title tunes, which was revolutionary for the time.

In the late 1980s and early '90s, he produced soundtracks for development teams Sensible Software and the Bitmap Brothers. He is also credited with the soundtrack to the C64 version of the hit Defender of the Crown.

He then went on to set up Audio Interactive at Pinewood Studios and, along with composer James Hannigan, helped Electronic Arts to win the BAFTA Award for best audio in 2000 for Theme Park World. From 1990 onwards Richard was a frequent musical collaborator with Jon Hare with whom he co-wrote and arranged all of Sensible Software's best known musical tracks including the soundtrack for Cannon Fodder the GBC version of which was also nominated for a BAFTA in 2000, and is still the only small-format soundtrack to be recognised by BAFTA to this day. In 1995 Hare and Joseph embarked upon an epic 32 track soundtrack for the multimedia product Sex 'n' Drugs 'n' Rock 'n' Roll, signed to Warner Interactive, however in 1998 Warner bowed out of the games market and their Magnum Opus was only ever released as a limited edition audio CD.

After working as Audio Director on Republic: The Revolution and Evil Genius for Elixir Studios (music composed by James Hannigan), both winning BAFTA nominations for Hannigan's scores, Richard moved to France where he ran SoundTropez, a company offering next-technology soundtracks.

Richard came from an entertainment family. Brother Eddy is a BAFTA-winning sound supervisor, working on films such as Harry Potter and James Bond. Brother Pat is a director of The Mill which won an Oscar for Gladiator. Nephew Alex is a foley supervisor. Richard's Father Teddy (1918–2006) was a production executive working on, amongst many others, films by John Schlesinger and Alfred Hitchcock.

After being diagnosed with lung cancer, he died on 4 March 2007 aged 53 years.

Works

References

External links

Profiles

Richard Joseph at MobyGames
Richard Joseph at OverClocked ReMix

Richard Joseph at CVGM

Articles and interviews
C64.COM audio interviews
Remix64 interview
Idlethumbs interview
Gamespot interview
Gamemusic article

1953 births
2007 deaths
Amiga people
British composers
British male composers
British people of Jewish descent
Commodore 64 music
Deaths from lung cancer
Sensible Software
Video game composers
20th-century British male musicians